The 113th Mixed Brigade was a unit of the Spanish Republican Army that participated in the Spanish Civil War, deployed on the Tagus front.

History 
The unit was created in March 1937 in the Almagro area, from the recruits of 1936. The 113th Mixed Brigade was assigned to the 36th Division of VII Army Corps, with the idea of its participation in the plan P. The operation, however, was not carried out and instead the brigade was sent to the Toledo front, at the beginning of May, to plug the rupture of that sector due to a nationalist attack. During the rest of the conflict, it did not intervene in any other operation.

In March 1939, the commander of the brigade, the militia major Ángel Carrasco, was dismissed by the Casadista forces as he had remained loyal to the government of Juan Negrín. A few weeks later, after the start of the final offensive, on March 27 the brigade dissolved itself and its forces surrendered to the Army Corps of the Maestrazgo.

Command 
 Commanders
 Infantry Lieutenant Colonel Francisco Mejide Gunrea;
 Militia major Olegario Pachón Núñez; 
 Militia major Gabriel Pareja Núñez;
 Militia major Ángel Carrasco Nolasco;

 Commissars
 Pedro Yáñez Jiménez, of the PSOE;
 José Sánchez Hidalgo;

 Chiefs of Staff
 Infantry commander Emilio López lbar;

Notes

References

Bibliography 
 
 

Military units and formations established in 1937
Military units and formations disestablished in 1939
Mixed Brigades (Spain)